"Then He Touched Me" is a single by American country music artist Jean Shepard.  Released in December 1969, it was the first single for the album A Woman's Hand.  The song reached #8 on the Billboard Hot Country Singles chart.

Chart performance

References 

1969 singles
Jean Shepard songs
Songs written by Norro Wilson
Songs written by George Richey
1969 songs
Capitol Records singles